I Haven't Got a Hat is a 1935 animated short film, directed by Isadore Freleng for Leon Schlesinger Productions as part of the Merrie Melodies series. Released on March 2, 1935, the short is notable for featuring the first appearance of several Warner Bros. cartoon characters, most notably future cartoon star Porky Pig. Beans the Cat, a minor Looney Tunes star in 1935-1936, also made his first appearance in this cartoon.

I Haven't Got a Hat was one of the earliest Technicolor Merrie Melodies, and (because of Walt Disney's exclusive deal with Technicolor at the time) was produced using Technicolor's two-strip process (red and green) instead of its more expensive and advanced three-strip process.

Plot
The short opens with introductions of Miss Cud (a cow who is the school teacher), Beans (who is caught defiantly eating from a jar of jam), Porky, Oliver Owl (who are both shown at once), and Ham and Ex (twin puppies). Little Kitty is absent from this sequence. A poster is shown explaining that the school children are sponsoring a musical and recital for the benefit of teachers and parents.

The school talent show first features Porky Pig reciting the Henry Wadsworth Longfellow poem Paul Revere's Ride, but with his excessive stutter (causing him to recite his part with incredible strain and sweat on some moments). A small gag involves Porky pointing to offstage students to provide sound effects for his next poem The Charge of the Light Brigade (the underside of a turtle's shell for a drum, and falling light bulbs for gunfire). However, he points to the wrong student, but the intended student takes his cue, and Porky points to the correct one. The class children whistle and cat-call which makes several stray dogs burst into the schoolhouse and chase poor Porky out.

Little Kitty attempts to recite "Mary Had a Little Lamb". She is so nervous that she forgets a couple of lines (even confusing snow for corn flakes) and then proceeds with the rhyme but gradually speeds up her voice to a high pitch. Throughout her performance, she is fidgeting and crossing her legs in a way to suggest that she urgently needs the toilet. She reaches the end of the rhyme as she makes a hasty exit, to a building that may be the school outhouse.

Ham and Ex sing the song "I Haven't Got a Hat", written by Buddy Bernier and Bob Emmerich. During this performance, Oliver Owl haughtily refuses to share a bag of candy with Beans, who is angered by Oliver's snobbery.

When Oliver goes up for his piano recital, Beans decides it is time for payback and sneaks a stray cat and dog into the piano. Their commotion creates a virtuoso performance of Franz von Suppé's Poet and Peasant overture to riotous applause. When the animals jump out of the piano (with the cat chasing the dog rather than vice versa) the ruse is revealed to the audience's disapproval and Oliver, humbled and vengeful, covers Beans in green ink from his pen, causing Beans to fall off his ladder and launch a pail of red paint onto Oliver. Caught in the same predicament, they shake hands as the cartoon ends. This end scene emphasizes the fact that this was a two-strip Technicolor cartoon, with only red and green hues. At the time (as stated before), the three-strip process (with blue hues added) was exclusive to Disney for use in cartoons. This contract ran out in the fall of 1935, and WB released their first three-strip Technicolor cartoon, Flowers for Madame, in November of that year.

Production notes
Inspired by the Hal Roach Our Gang live-action shorts, the short introduces several new characters as grade school students in the hope that some would catch on. At the time, the only star for the more character-driven Looney Tunes series was Buddy, a meager replacement for the feistier Bosko, who left Schlesinger's studio with his creators Hugh Harman and Rudolf Ising.

The entry introduces the following characters:
 Beans the Cat, a mischievous young cat voiced by Billy Bletcher.
 Little Kitty, a nervous girl cat, voiced by Bernice Hansen in falsetto.
 Porky Pig, a stuttering pig voiced by Joe Dougherty.
 Oliver Owl, a haughty owl who taunts Beans.
 Ham and Ex, (Hansen and Bletcher) twin singing puppies, voiced by Bernice Hansen
 Tommy Turtle, a background character.

Though the gags are fairly indicative of early 1930s cartoons, I Haven't Got a Hat is significant for launching the career of Porky Pig, who went on to become a Warner Bros. regular for the next 30 years. Oliver Owl effectively disappeared after Plane Dippy; Beans and Kitty (now a couple) and Ham and Ex would continue to make occasional appearances through 1936.

References

Further reading
 Beck, Jerry. (2005) Audio commentary on "I Haven't Got a Hat" for the Warner Brothers' DVD set Looney Tunes Golden Collection, Volume 3 and Porky Pig 101.

External links
 
 I Haven't Got a Hat at the Big Cartoon Database
 I Haven't Got A Hat on the Internet Archive
 The cartoon

1935 films
1935 animated films
1935 comedy films
1930s color films
Films scored by Bernard B. Brown
Films scored by Norman Spencer (composer)
Short films directed by Friz Freleng
Beans the Cat films
Porky Pig films
Films set in schools
Merrie Melodies short films
Animated films about cats
Animated films about birds
Animated films about dogs
1930s Warner Bros. animated short films